The 1999 Copa Libertadores was the 40th edition of the Copa Libertadores, South America's premier club championship. It was held between February 21 and June 16. Palmeiras became the champions after beating Deportivo Cali on penalties for the first time in their history.

First round

Teams in green qualified to the Round of 16
Teams in red were eliminated

Twenty teams were distributed among five groups in the First Round; the top three of each group qualified to the playoff bracket.  Vasco da Gama (winner of the previous edition of the tournament) received a bye to the playoff bracket.

Group 1

Group 2

Group 3

Group 4

Group 5

Knockout stages

Bracket

Round of 16

First leg matches were played on April 14. Second leg matches were on April 20 and April 21.

Quarterfinals

First leg matches were played on May 5. Second leg matches were played on May 12.

Semi-finals
 

First leg matches were played on May 19. Second leg matches were played on May 26.

Finals

First leg match were played on June 2. Second leg match were played on June 16.

Champion

Broadcasting rights

Americas 
  Latin America: local channels

References

CONMEBOL: Copa Toyota Libertadores 1999

1
Copa Libertadores seasons